Bakau is a town on the Atlantic coast of Gambia, west of Gambia's capital city of Banjul.  It is known for its botanical gardens, its crocodile pool Bakau Kachikally and for the beaches at Cape Point. Bakau is the first major suburb outside Banjul and the most developed town in the Gambia. Close to Bakau and Banjul is Gambia's largest city, Serekunda.

History 
Legend has it that Bakau grew up around the holy crocodile pool in Kachikally, the central district of Bakau. Bakau itself was a small village at the turn of the 19th century and grew in importance as it became a favourite place for private residences of colonial administrators, especially along the beautiful palm fringed beaches.
Despite being a major town, the old village still exists and is run like any other in the Gambia, with an 'Alkali' (similar to 'Mayor') and divided into Kabilos. There exists a much smaller village within the old village called Bakau Wasulung Kunda, indicating the migrant origins of its inhabitants.
As people began to move out of Banjul, government allocated residential areas quickly sprang around the old village, acquiring new names in the process. What were farms of the local population became well planned suburbs filled with bungalows, such as Fajara, New Town, Cape Point, Mile7 and Farrowkono (formerly used as gardens by the locals)

Economy 

Tourism is the most important business activity in Bakau providing a lot of employment, as well as income for the municipal authority. At Cape Point there are a few hotels on a beach, arguably superior to the main Atlantic Ocean beach, which is home to most of the hotels in the country. In town there are a few guest houses. There is also a major market along the main road famous for its fruit and vegetables.

Fishing is also another major business activity and there is a fishing port by the town beach, together with a wharf where a market attracts many visitors. One of the few ice plants in the country is located there.

Gardening is also another major business activity in which the local women are mostly engaged on for livelihood. The town has many shops, selling different types of products and services along the Sait Matty Road.

Afrinat International Airlines had its head office in Bakau.

Bakau Primary School
NewTown Primary School
Marina International Scholl
West African International School
Gambia Methodist Academy
American International School
Glory Baptist Senior Secondary School
Bakau Upper Basic School
Presidents' Awards Scheme
Katchikally Nursery School
Starlight School

Infrastructure 
Bakau is perhaps the most developed settlement in the Gambia, with excellent communication facilities. Only the major roads are paved and the rate of electricity connection is almost universal. There are several hotels and a few guest houses. The only national Stadium, The Independence Stadium, is located here.
The national broadcaster, Radio Gambia, is located in Bakau at its Mile 7 studios. UN country headquarters is also located here with different foreign embassies. There is also a large military camp, a police barracks and a fire brigade.

Attractions 
Kachikally Museum and Crocodile Pool, Bakau
Botanical Gardens, Atlantic Boulevard Road, Bakau
Fajara Hotel, Fajara, Bakau
Ocean bay Hotel, Cape Point
African Village Hotel, Bakau
Cape Point Hotel, Cape Point
Sun Beach Hotel, Cape Point
The Garden Guest House, Bakau
Bakau Basketball Academy, Bakau 
Swedish and Norwegian Consulate
Independence Stadium, Bakau
Rock Heights, Cape Point
Tanbi Wetland Complex, Old Cape Road
UNICEF office 
British embassy, 48, Atlantic boulevard, Fajara
Fajara war cemetery,

Notable people

 Dawda Jawara, former head of state of The Gambia
 Hassan Bubacar Jallow, Chief Justice of The Gambia 
 Raymond Sock, Judge
  Amie Bensouda , Corporate Lawyer 
 Jaysuma Saidy Ndure, athlete 
 Njogu Demba-Nyrén, footballer
 Kekuta Manneh, footballer
 Amadou Sanyang, footballer
 Lamin Jallow, footballer
 Jizzle, musician
 Malando Gassama, percussionist
 Abdou Jammeh, footballer
 Bubacarr Jobe, footballer
 Florence Mahoney, Educator and Professor

Gallery

References

External links

 Bakau Hotels, Photos, Information and Map
 Bakau is linked to Kings Langley, a village in Hertfordshire, UK

 
Populated coastal places in the Gambia